Pelle og Proffen is Norwegian writer Ingvar Ambjørnsen's youth series about Pelle and Proffen, two fictional detective teenage boys from Oslo, getting involved in all kinds of crimes or mysteries involving such things as drugs, pollution and Nazism, usually in the Oslo area but also elsewhere in Norway. They are very similar to Franklin Dixon's Hardy Boys. The stories are told by Pelle who lives in an apartment in Torshov, Oslo with his parents. Proffen lives with his parents in the apartment below so the boys can reach each other through Pelle's floor and Proffen's roof.

Together they try to solve the mysteries they get into. Proffen is the smarter one. One of his interests is reading good detective books. His brother is a journalist from the Norwegian newspaper Dagbladet, who tries to help the boys as well as he can by supplying them with unofficial information he got from Dagbladet.

The books Døden på Oslo S, Giftige Løgner and De Blå Ulvene were turned into successful films. Døden på Oslo S became particularly well known for the way it dealt with Oslo underground life.

Books in the series about Pelle og Proffen 
 Kjempene faller (Giants Are Falling, 1987)
 Døden på Oslo S (Death at Oslo Central Station, 1988) (turned into film)
 Giftige løgner (Toxic Lies, 1989) (turned into film)
 Sannhet til salgs (Truth for Sale, 1990)
 De blå ulvene (The Blue Wolves, 1991) (turned into film)
 Flammer i snø (Fire in the Snow, 1992)
 Etter orkanen (After the Hurricane, 1993)
 Hevnen fra himmelen (The Revenge from the Sky, 1994)
 Storbyens stemme (Voice of the Big City, 1994)
 Mordet på Aker Brygge (The Murder at Aker Brygge, 1995)

Norwegian novels
Children's novels
Series of children's books
Novels set in Norway
Children's mystery novels
Norwegian children's literature